Henry Shaw (5 September 1850 – 2 May 1928) was a British-born New Zealand accountant, bibliophile and local politician.

Shaw was a member of the Auckland City Council from 1910 to 1912, where he was a member of the library committee. He donated his large collection of rare antique books to the Auckland City Library.

References

1850 births
1928 deaths
People from Birmingham, West Midlands
British emigrants to New Zealand
Auckland City Councillors